Steven Geoffrey Murrells,  (born 3 August 1965) is a British businessman, the former chief executive of The Co-operative Group, and the former chief executive of Co-op Food (and Co-op Electricals). Co-op Food has over 2,800 stores in the UK – at least one in every postal area. It is the sixth largest food retailer in the UK. Co-op Food turns over around £9.5bn, with around 6% of the grocery market.

Early life
He was born in Colchester in Essex.

Career
Murrells held senior leadership roles in European and UK-based food retail businesses, including One Stop, Sainsbury’s and Tesco. He spent three years as CEO of Danish meat company, Tulip, before joining Co-op in 2012.
The Guardian reported that Murrells was paid a £2.2 million bonus in 2020.

He became chief executive of Co-operative Retail in July 2012. 

He became chief executive of The Co-operative Group on 1 March 2017.

Murrells was appointed Commander of the Order of the British Empire (CBE) in the 2022 New Year Honours for services to the food supply chain.

In May 2022, it was announced that he would be succeeded as CEO by Shirine Khoury-Haq.

References

1965 births
British retail chief executives
English businesspeople in retailing
People from Colchester
People from Prestbury, Cheshire
The Co-operative Group
Living people
Commanders of the Order of the British Empire